Mental Health Act is a stock short title used for legislation relating to mental health law.

List

Canada
 Mental Health Act (Ontario) (Ontario)

India
The Mental Health Care Act, 2017

Ireland
The Mental Health Act 2001

New Zealand
The Mental health (Compulsory Assessment and Treatment) Act 1992

Republic of Ireland
The Mental Health Act 2001

Singapore
 The Mental Health (Care and Treatment) Act (Singapore) passed in 2008

United Kingdom

The Mental Health Act 1959 (c. 72) 
The Mental Health (Amendment) Act 1982 (c. 51) 
The Mental Health Act 1983, an Act of the Parliament of the United Kingdom
The Mental Health (Scotland) Act 1984, an Act of the Parliament of the United Kingdom
The Mental Health (Detention) (Scotland) Act 1991 (c. 47) 
The Mental Health (Amendment) Act 1994 (c. 6) 
The Mental Health (Patients in the Community) Act 1995 (c. 52) 
The Mental Health (Public Safety and Appeals) (Scotland) Act 1999 (asp 1) 
The Mental Health (Amendment) (Scotland) Act 1999 (c. 32) 
The Mental Health (Care and Treatment) (Scotland) Act 2003, an Act of the Scottish Parliament
The Mental Health Act 2007, an Act of the Parliament of the United Kingdom
The Mental Health (Wales) Measure 2010 (nawm 7)
The Mental Health (Discrimination) Act 2013 (c. 8)
The Mental Health Units (Use of Force) Act 2018

United States
The National Mental Health Act of 1946, which called for the establishment of a National Institute of Mental Health 
The Community Mental Health Act, created by John F. Kennedy in 1963 as part of his New Frontier
The Mental Health Parity Act of 1996

See also
List of short titles

References

Lists of legislation by short title